Tube-nosed bat may refer to any of the following species:

Suborder Yangochiroptera
Genus Murina
Bronze tube-nosed bat, M. aenea
Little tube-nosed bat, M. aurata
Beelzebub's tube-nosed bat, M. beelzebub
Bicolored tube-nosed bat, M. bicolor
Ashy-gray tube-nosed bat, M. cineracea
Round-eared tube-nosed bat, M. cyclotis
Elery's tube-nosed bat, M. eleryi
Flute-nosed bat, M. florium
Dusky tube-nosed bat, M. fusca
Slender tube-nosed bat, M. gracilis
Da Lat tube-nosed-bat, Murina harpioloides
Harrison's tube-nosed bat, M. harrisoni
Hilgendorf's tube-nosed bat, M. hilgendorfi
Hkakabo Razi tube-nosed bat, M. hkakaboraziensis
Hutton's tube-nosed bat, M. huttoni
Greater tube-nosed bat, M. leucogaster
Taiwan tube-nosed bat, M. puta
Faint-colored tube-nosed bat, M. recondita
Gilded tube-nosed bat, M. rozendaali
Ryukyu tube-nosed bat, M. ryukyuana
Brown tube-nosed bat, M. suilla
Gloomy tube-nosed bat, M. tenebrosa
Scully's tube-nosed bat, M. tubinaris
Ussuri tube-nosed bat, M. ussuriensis
Walston's tube-nosed bat, M. walstoni

Genus Harpiola
Peters's tube-nosed bat, H.  grisea
Formosan golden tube-nosed bat, H. isodon

Suborder Yinpterochiroptera
Genus Nyctimene
 Broad-striped tube-nosed bat, Nyctimene aello
 Common tube-nosed bat, Nyctimene albiventer
 Pallas's tube-nosed bat, Nyctimene cephalotes
 Dark tube-nosed bat, Nyctimene celaeno
 Mountain tube-nosed bat, Nyctimene  certans
 Round-eared tube-nosed bat, Nyctimene cyclotis
 Dragon tube-nosed bat, Nyctimene draconilla
 Keast's tube-nosed bat, Nyctimene keasti
 Island tube-nosed bat, Nyctimene major
 Malaita tube-nosed bat, Nyctimene malaitensis
 Demonic tube-nosed bat, Nyctimene masalai
 Lesser tube-nosed bat, Nyctimene  minutus
 Philippine tube-nosed bat, Nyctimene rabori
 Eastern tube-nosed bat, Nyctimene robinsoni
 Nendo tube-nosed bat, Nyctimene sanctacrucis
 Umboi tube-nosed bat, Nyctimene vizcaccia
 New Guinea tube-nosed bat, Nyctimene wrightae

Animal common name disambiguation pages